The women's long jump event at the 1934 British Empire Games was held on 7 August at the White City Stadium in London, England.

Results

References

Athletics at the 1934 British Empire Games
1934